Holy Week in Spain is the annual tribute of the Passion of Jesus Christ celebrated by Catholic religious brotherhoods (Spanish: cofradía) and fraternities that perform penance processions on the streets of almost every Spanish city and town during the last week of Lent, the week immediately before Easter.

Description
Spain is known especially for its Holy Week traditions or Semana Santa. The celebration of Holy Week regarding popular piety relies almost exclusively on the processions of the brotherhoods or fraternities. These associations have their origins in the Middle Age, but a number of them were created during the Baroque Period, inspired by the Counterreformation and also during the 20th and 21st centuries. The membership is usually open to any Catholic person and family tradition is an important element to become a member or "brother" (hermano).

Some major differences between Spanish regions are perceivable in this event: Holy Week sees its most glamorous celebrations in the region of Andalusia, especially in Jerez de la Frontera, Granada, Málaga and Seville, while those of Castile and Leon see the more sombre and solemn processions, typified by Semana Santa at Zamora, Leon and Valladolid. This is a religious holiday.

A common feature in Spain is the almost general usage of the nazareno or penitential robe for some of the participants in the processions. This garment consists of a tunic, a hood with conical tip (capirote) used to conceal the face of the wearer, and sometimes a cloak. The exact colors and forms of these robes depend on the particular procession. The robes were widely used in the medieval period for penitents, who could demonstrate their penance while still masking their identity.  These nazarenos carry processional candles or rough-hewn wooden crosses, may walk the city streets barefoot, and, in some places may carry shackles and chains on their feet as penance.
In some areas, sections of the participants wear dress freely inspired by the uniforms of the Roman Legion.

The other common feature is that every brotherhood carries magnificent "Pasos" or floats with sculptures that depict different scenes from the gospels related to the Passion of Christ or the Sorrows of Virgin Mary. Many of these floats are art pieces created by Spanish artists such as Gregorio Fernandez, Juan de Mesa, Martínez Montañés or Mariano Benlliure. Brotherhoods have owned and preserved these "pasos" for centuries in some cases. Usually, the "pasos" are accompanied by Marching bands performing "Marchas procesionales" a specific type of compositions, devoted to the images and fraternities.

Holy Week in Andalusia
During Holy Week in Andalusia, Malaga (1980), Granada (2009) and Seville (1980) are declared of international tourist interest. Holy Week in Jerez de la Frontera (1993), Cabra (1989), Río Gordo (1997), Baena (2001) and Almería (2017) are of national tourist interest. In another Range are those declared only of tourist Interest by the Secretary of State of the Government of Spain, which falls within the Holy Week of Arcos de la Frontera (1980), Puente Genil (1980), Baeza (1980), Ubeda (1980), Jaen (1981) and Huercal Overa (1983). At the next level comes the turn of those declared of national tourist interest by the Andalusian Government, which are Córdoba, Ecija, Ayamonte, Antequera, Castro del Río, Marchena, Huelva, Utrera, Lucena and dozens of other Andalusian municipalities.

Almeria 
There are, in total, 26 brotherhoods in Almeria and 3 "pre-brotherhoods". The most important brotherhoods are; "La Estrella" "Prendimiento" and "Estudiantes." Holy Week in Almería was declared of National Tourist Interest in 2017.

Cádiz 
Cádiz's Holy Week has an artistic heritage stemming from important sculptors such as Miguel Láinez Capote and Jacinto Pimentel, incorporating the special importance of Genoese imagery. The 31 brotherhoods of the city march along streets of the historic center among eighteenth-century style buildings. When carrying their floats, the brotherhoods of Cádiz use a shoulder-to-shoulder technique which is unique from other locations.

Jerez de la Frontera  

The Holy Week of Jerez de la Frontera stands out for being one of the most important in Andalusia in terms of number of brotherhoods, quality in its carvings and iconographic sets. Holy Week in Jerez was declared of National Tourist Interest in 1993. Its 45 brotherhoods of penance fill with content a week, which goes from The Saturday of Passion to Easter Sunday, in which the historical roots of this particular celebration once again take effect.  Holy Week in Jerez boasts a rich historical and artistic cultural heritage since the most renowned image makers, carvers, goldsmiths and embroiderers of recent centuries have contributed to making it great, leaving behind a legacy that is difficult to match. Every year it has corners especially dedicated to the saeta that catalyzes the enormous cultural heritage of this genuine way of understanding this flamenco art. In short, a Holy Week with its own idiosyncrasy, which also unites these references, an imagery of enormous quality, and also, a magnificent collection of belongings, some of which comes from the first Sevillian processional school, renovated in its day, with final destination in Jerez. This allows you to enjoy every year mystery steps full of undoubted flavor, which still retain the aura with which they were conceived, and equally, pallium steps that inherit from history the design, goldsmithing and embroidery of the great masters. All these circumstances, together with the high number of brotherhoods, and together with the presence of the typical flamenco saeta, make this Holy Week one of the most relevant in Andalusia and Spain. The brotherhoods arrive at the Cathedral for an official route. Jerez de la Frontera has the longest official route in Spain, 1.3 km. Jerez de la Frontera has its own Diocese, independent of that of Cádiz-Ceuta, so although it belongs to the province of Cádiz, it must be studied individually as another Diocese.

Córdoba 
Córdoba holds one of the most popular Holy Week in Andalusia. 37 brotherhoods take part in processions with elaborate "pasos" which represents the scenes of the events of The Passion of Christ.

Granada 

It was declared a Festival of International Tourist Interest in 2009. Although there were processions from Granada in the 16th and 17th centuries, 2 was at the beginning of the 20th century when this tradition was extended and consolidated. 32 fraternities and 34 Nazarene courts participate.
The Royal Federation of Brotherhoods and Brotherhoods of Granada is the body in charge of the regulation of the set of brotherhoods of the city.

In this city Christian brotherhoods and institutions were created from the taking of Granada in 1492. The processions will be extended in the sixteenth century with the Counter-Reformation and there will also be some in the XVII.2 However, the bulk of the brotherhoods they were founded from the beginning of the 20th century.

At the beginning of the 20th century, the archbishop's support and the resurgence of the local bourgeoisie led to a boom in Holy Week. This revival began in 1996 with the procession of the Holy Great Burial. In the 1920s, seven new churches were founded brotherhoods of penance. In 1927 the Federation of Brotherhoods of Granada was created, 5 in a similar way to the Association of Brotherhoods of Malaga created in 1921.

In 1936 Federico García Lorca wrote a narrative for Unión Radio about Holy Week in Granada. Since 1970 this tradition has suffered a certain decline, although it will recover from 1977.

Málaga

It was declared a Festival of International Tourist Interest in 1980. Over 500 years, Holy Week of Málaga has been constantly present in the religious and popular feeling of people from Málaga. The Holy Week religious celebrations in Málaga are famous countrywide. Processions start on Palm Sunday and continue until Easter Sunday with the most dramatic and solemn on Maundy Thursday and Good Friday. Images from the Passion on huge ornate "tronos" (floats or thrones) some weighing more than 5.000 kilos and carried by more than 250 members of Nuestra Señora de la Esperanza, shape the processions that go through the streets with penitents dressed in long purple robes, often with pointed hats, followed by women in black carrying candles. Drums and trumpets play solemn music and occasionally someone spontaneously sings a mournful saeta dedicated to the floats as it makes its way slowly round the streets.

The Baroque taste of the religious brotherhoods and associations, along with the great amount of processional materials that they have been accumulating for centuries, result in a street stage of exuberant art, full of color and majesty. Many brotherhoods were affected by the burning churches in 1931 and an important part of their heritage was destroyed (i.e. trousseaus, imagery, and other equipment) during the Spanish Civil War. In the years following it, revival was slow but it recovered with much greater numbers than before. Also, by the 1970s, Cofradías nuevas began to be formed in the city, and some old brotherhoods which had been forgotten, were reorganized by young people as: Salud, Descendimiento, Monte Calvario and many more others to adapt to the changing times.

Every year, the Passion Week in Málaga takes out to the streets a real festival perceptible by the five senses: processional thrones carrying images that sway all along the entire route, thousands of penitents lighting and giving colour with their candles and robes, processional marches, as well as aromas of incense and flowers filling the air as the processions pass by and thousands of people crowded to see and applaud their favorite tronos.

Holy Week in Málaga is very different from that celebrated in other Andalusian or Spanish places, and those who go to Málaga for the first time will be surprised, as the Passion Week there is not lived with meditation and silence, but it is full of happiness, noise, cheer, spontaneous saetas (flamenco verses sung at the processions) and applause as the images pass by.

Some tronos (floats) of Holy Week of Málaga are so huge that they must be housed in other places different from the churches, as they are taller than the entrance doors: real walking chapels of over 5,000 kilos carried by dozens of bearers. There are also military parades playing processional marches or singing their anthems along the route. All of this does not imply a lack of religiosity (nor the opposite though, since not few of the participants consider themselves lapsed catholics), but it is just the particular way that many people from Málaga live their faith, folkloric gustoes and/or feelings during the Holy Week. One of these military celebrations is that of the Spanish Legion, which parades the image of Christ of the Good Death together with the Legion's own military band and Honor guard on Maundy Thursday, very popular among tourists, locals, and military veterans.

Seville

It was declared a Festival of International Tourist Interest in 1980. Seville arguably holds some of the most elaborate processions for Holy Week. The tradition dates from Counter Reformation times, or even earlier. The "Semana Santa de Sevilla" is notable for featuring the procession of "pasos", lifelike painted wooden sculptures of individual scenes of the events that happened between Jesus' entry in Jerusalem and his burial, or images of the Virgin Mary showing restrained grief for the torture and killing of her son. Some of the images are artistic masterworks of great antiquity. One of the Most Popular and Beautiful Image of the Virgin Mary depicting her Sorrows is the Nuestra Señora de la Esperanza de Triana, "La Reina y Señora de Sevilla" (The Queen and Lady of Seville) 
These "pasos" (which usually weigh over a metric ton) are physically carried on the neck of costaleros (literally "sack men", for their distinctive -and functional- headdress). The "costaleros" (from 24 to 48) are hidden inside the platform of the "paso", so it seems to walk alone. Historically dock workers were hired to carry the "pasos". From 1973 onward, that task has been universally taken over by the members of the confraternities who organize each procession.

Holy Week in Castile and León

León

Holy Week processions in León are also very popular, with more than 15,000 penitents (called papones, in Leonese language) on the streets. Processions begin on "Viernes de Dolores" (the Friday in the week before Holy Week) and last until Easter Sunday. The most solemn and famous procession is the "", also known as the "" (Procession of the Meeting). During this nine-hour marathon procession, about 4,000 penitents carry 13 "pasos" around all the city.

Semana Santa in Leon was declared Fiesta of International Tourist Interest of Spain in 2002.

Also famous is a secular procession, called Entierro de Genarín, the "Burial of Genarín".  In 1929 on Holy Thursday night, a poor alcoholic called Genaro Blanco was run over by the first rubbish truck in León.  The procession consists of a march through the city bearing Orujo at the head of the procession; at the spot by the face of the city walls where the man was run over a bottle of Orujo and 27 oranges are left in commemoration.

Salamanca

Salamanca has one of the oldest celebrations in Spain. The earliest penance processions can be traced back to 1240. Three are the characteristics that make Holy Week in Salamanca unique: The monumental background provided by the Old City, declared UNESCO World Heritage Site in 1988, the quality of the images and pasos, created by important Spanish artist such as Luis Salvador Carmona or Mariano Benlliure and the links with the University of Salamanca, the oldest institution of its kind in the country.

10,000 penitents associated to 18 brotherhoods organize 24 processions that walk the streets of the center carrying 43 pasos from Friday of Sorrows to Easter Sunday.

Semana Santa in Salamanca was declared Fiesta of International Tourist Interest of Spain in 2003.

Valladolid

Easter in Valladolid holds ("Semana Santa" in Spanish) is one of the best known Catholic traditions in Valladolid. As a reflection of its importance, is also considered as a Fiesta of International Tourist Interest of Spain since 1981. The Good Friday processions are considered an exquisite and rich display of Castilian religious sculpture. On this day, in the morning, members of the brotherhoods on horseback make a poetic proclamation throughout the city. The "Sermon of the Seven Words" is spoken in Plaza Mayor Square. In the afternoon, thousands of people take part in the Passion Procession, comprising 31 pasos (religious statues), most of which date from the 16th and 17th centuries, by artists like Juan de Juni or Gregorio Fernández. The last statue in the procession is the Virgen de las Angustias, and her return to the church is one of the most emotional moments of the celebrations, with the Salve Popular sung in her honour.ye

Easter is one of the most spectacular and emotional fiestas in Valladolid. Religious devotion, art, colour and music combine in acts to commemorate the death of Jesus Christ: the processions. Members of the different Easter brotherhoods, dressed in their characteristic robes, parade through the streets carrying religious statues (pasos) to the sound of drums and music.

The National Sculpture Museum of the city gives a total of 104 images (distributed in the corresponding pasos) to the processions, such as fact museum unique in Spain.

Zamora

Zamora has the oldest celebrations in Spain. The earliest penance processions can be traced back to 1179. 
Holy Week in Zamora is celebrated by 16 sisterhoods and fraternities that perform 17 penance processions on the streets of the old city. Thousands of penitents walk the streets while the processions are attended by a crowd of locals and visitors. Zamora increases its population 5 times, up to 300.000 people during the festival.

The singularities of this celebration include the medieval set up of some of the parades where the brotherhoods use monk´s robes instead of the most usual nazareno´s conical hat, torch fire instead of candles or male choirs instead of marching bands.

Semana Santa in Zamora was declared Fiesta of International Tourist Interest of Spain in 1986.

Holy Week in Region of Murcia

Cartagena

The processions in Cartagena do not closely resemble others in Spain due to their strict order and unique characteristics.

Every brotherhood is divided into smaller groups ("agrupaciones"), each in charge of one of the floats in the procession. The members of the group are all clad in the same colours and wear a robe, a sash around the waist, a cloak, a high pointed hood to cover their heads and faces, and sandals.

Each float is preceded at the front by a richly embroidered standard ("estandarte"), carried by three members of the group and followed by two symmetrical lines of members, who march and stop in unison to the beat of drums. When they stop, they all remain absolutely still and in total silence.  Their military-like discipline may have earned their nickname of "tercio", a word which broadly means "regiment".

At the rear of the "tercio" come a music band and the drummers, and then the trono made of artistically carved gilded or painted wood. Some of these floats move on wheels whereas others are carried on the shoulders of hundreds of "portapasos" (or float-carriers), who also march to the rhythmic beat of the drums.

On the top of the float you can see the processional images, polychrome wooden sculptures which are displayed either separately or in groups. The images include works by classic artists such as Francisco Salzillo, José Capuz, Juan González Moreno, Mariano Benlliure, or Federico Coullaut-Valera as well as others by contemporary sculptors. Unlike in other cities, in Cartagena the order of the floats in the procession follows the chronological order of the events narrated in the Gospels.

The images are surrounded by "cartelas", a kind of electric candelabra or sometimes a sort of upside-down chandeliers, fixed to the float and decorated with colourful and intricate floral arrangements.

Also unique in Cartagena are the infantry companies ("piquetes") at the rear of the main processions, escorting the float of St. Mary which, under popular Marian advocations such as Our Lady of Sorrows or Our Lady of Solitude, usually closes the procession.

It must have been this uniqueness which awarded the Holy Week of Cartagena the rank of International Tourist Interest Festival in 2005.

The processions in Cartagena are organized by four brotherhoods:

The penitential brotherhood of the Most Holy Christ of Succour leads the prayer of the Stations of the Cross (via crucis) around the city on the early hours of Friday of Passion Week (the Friday before Good Friday), when the festivity of the Patron Saint of the city, Our Lady of The Seven Sorrows, takes place. The colour of this brotherhood is black.
The brotherhood of the Hour of Our Lord Jesus´ Arrest (known as "Californios") organises the processions that take place on the evening of Friday of Passion Week, on Holy Tuesday and Holy Wednesday and on Maundy Thursday. The colour of this brotherhood is red.
The brotherhood of Our Lord Jesus of Nazareth (known as Marrajos) is in charge of the processions held on Holy Monday, on the early hours of Good Friday, in the evening of Good Friday and on Holy Saturday. The colour of this brotherhood is purple.
The brotherhood of Our Lord Jesus Resurrected (known as Resucitados) organises the procession on the morning of Easter Sunday. The colour of this brotherhood is white.

Given its role as the historical home of the Spanish Navy, every year on Holy Tuesday the Spanish Navy Marines send a delegation to the procession on that day.

Mula
The Noche de los Tambores is celebrated on Tuesday during Holy Week celebrations in Mula, when at midnight thousands of people play the drums when the bell rings, preceded by a trumpet song. Declared as a National Touristic Interest, it is a tradition born after the banning of playing drums and other instruments during Holy Week celebrations out of the "procession" hours, by the Catholic local authorities in the 19th century. Drummers, known as "Tamboristas", continue playing on Good Friday and Easter Sunday.

Lorca
Holy Week in Lorca is one of the most important demonstrations of celebration of Holy Week in Spain. Regardless of the existence of religious processions in the traditional way, are the Bible Parades Passionate dotting the Easter lorquina of a unique and different, with representations of the Old Testament or the Christian symbolism or with the participation of horses and chariots and floats of enormous dimensions. The embroidered silk are also a prominent feature of Lorca processions, marked by an extraordinary rivalry between two of its fraternities or steps, the Blue and White.

The most important step is the Royal and Illustrious Confraternity of Our Lady of the Rosary (White Pass) is traditionally considered going back to the 15th century, although the oldest documents referring to the same date of 1599.  Its owner is the virgin of bitterness known as the beautiful, which is carried on Good Friday in a golden throne carried by over 130 people.  The White Pass has over 1,500 embroideries in silk and gold.  The other step is Brotherhood of Farmers Lorca (blue pass).  Holder is Our Lady of Sorrows, and also embroidered in silk and gold.

Holy Week in Galicia

Ferrol
Ferrol's Holy Week is one of the two main celebrations of this type in Galicia. It is a Fiesta of International Tourist Interest since 2014 and Fiesta of National Tourist Interest of Spain before that, since 1995.

Since Palm Sunday to Easter Sunday 25 processions go over the three oldest neighborhoods of the town organized by 5 different "cofradías." This processions are composed by "tronos" which carry statues of Christ, the Virgin Mary and other saints on them. These tronos are richly adorned with golden and silver, and decorated with numerous flowers. These statues are accompanied by devotees wearing habits and capirotes and carrying candles. These people are commonly called "capuchones." Moreover, the processions are also accompanied by music played by brass bands.

During the celebrations of Ferrol's Holy Week, the town receives thousands of tourists and the environment is warm and friendly. Furthermore, a lot of complementary activities are programmed during all the week.

Viveiro

Holy Week in Viveiro is one of the best known religious events within Galicia. As a reflection of its importance, is also considered as a Fiesta of National Tourist Interest of Spain since 1988.

This week features the procession of pasos, floats of lifelike wooden sculptures of individual scenes of the events of the Passion, or images of the Virgin Mary showing restrained grief for the torture and killing of her son. Some of the sculptures are of great antiquity and are considered artistic masterpieces, as well as being culturally and spiritually important to the local Catholic population.

During Holy Week, the city is crowded with residents and visitors, drawn by the spectacle and atmosphere. The impact is particularly strong for the Catholic community. The processions are organised by hermandades and cofradías, religious brotherhoods. During the processions, members precede the pasos, dressed in penitential robes. They may also be accompanied by brass bands.

The processions work along a designated route from their home churches and chapels, usually via a central viewing area and back. As of 2011, a total of 15 processions are scheduled for the week, from the previous Friday to Palm Sunday through to Easter Sunday morning.

Holy Week in Canary Islands

San Cristóbal de La Laguna

Holy Week in San Cristóbal de La Laguna (Tenerife), is the largest of the Canary Islands. Holy Week has steps of great historical and artistic value, such as the Cristo de La Laguna, accompanied by their guilds, some of them centuries old and which adopted the use of the hood in the nineteenth century, ride on the wheeled carts streets of the city.

La Orotava
It is one of the most important religious events in the city of northern Tenerife. A chain of fervors and evocations that collect in a mystical and self-absorbed way the celebration of the Death and Resurrection of Christ, a tradition that is part of the local religiosity and culture. Two days stand out in Holy Week in La Orotava: Holy Thursday with the Procession of the Mandate, and Good Friday, with the Procession of the Encounter.

Santa Cruz de Tenerife
The origin of Holy Week in the city and municipality of Santa Cruz de Tenerife dates back to the conquest of the island of Tenerife in the fifteenth century. Due to being a relatively large municipality, we can find many and varied celebrations both in the city center and in the outlying neighborhoods. The procession of Holy Tuesday of the Señor de las Tribulaciones and that of Holy Thursday of "La Macarena" stand out.

Santa Cruz de La Palma

Holy Week is commemorated each year in Santa Cruz de La Palma. It is one of the oldest festivities in the island of La Palma, and is the most significant public religious event that takes place in the city, except for the Lustral Festivity of the Bajada de la Virgen. In 2014 it was declared a Fiesta of Tourist Interest in the Canary Islands.

Las Palmas de Gran Canaria
Las Palmas de Gran Canaria's Holy Week it is the most important Holy Week on the island of Gran Canaria. Here the processions of Good Friday stand out, such as the Magna Procession and the Procession of the Our Lady of Solitude.

Other Holy Week celebrations in Spain

Andalucia
 Almería
 Aracena
 Baeza
 Cádiz
 Córdoba
 Granada
 Huelva
 Jaén
 Jerez de la Frontera
 Lebrija, see Lebrija: Holy Week
 Linares
 Málaga, see Holy Week in Málaga
 Seville, see Holy Week in Seville
 Écija

Asturias
 Oviedo
 Avilés
 Gijón
 Luanco
 Luarca
 Villaviciosa
 Candás
 Llanes
 Infiesto

Basque Country
 Bilbao
 Balmaseda

Castile and León
 Ávila
 León
 Palencia
 Salamanca, see Holy Week in Salamanca
 Valladolid, see Holy Week in Valladolid 
 Zamora, see Holy Week in Zamora

Navarra
 Pamplona Hermandad de la Pasión de Nuestro Señor Jesucristo

Castile-La Mancha
 Cuenca, see Holy Week in Cuenca
Hellin
 Tobarra
 Toledo Toledo Interactivo

Catalonia
 Hospitalet de Llobregat
 Tarragona
 Barcelona

Community of Madrid
 Alcalá de Henares
 Madrid

Extremadura
 Badajoz
 Cáceres
 Mérida
 Montijo

Galicia
 Viveiro, see Holy Week in Viveiro
 Ferrol.

Murcia

 Cartagena, Spain
 Lorca, Spain
 Moratalla, see Moratalla: Holy Week
 Mula, with a very exciting "Tamborada" on Tuesday late at night
 Murcia

Valencian Community
 Alicante
 Elche
 Llíria
 Monòver
 Orihuela

Canary Islands
 La Orotava
 Los Realejos
 San Cristóbal de La Laguna, see Holy Week in San Cristóbal de La Laguna
 Santa Cruz de Tenerife
 Las Palmas de Gran Canaria
 Santa Cruz de La Palma

Ceuta & Melilla 
 Ceuta
 Melilla

Tourism

Holy Week is not only a religious, cultural and social event but a touristic one. Many visitors from inside and outside Spain travel to attend the crowded parades. The most popular destinations holds titles and declarations of International Interest for tourist of Spain and are promoted in major International Fairs, TV, press and so on. Every year, many hand guides are released, including timetables, routes and pasos of every procession so visitors can easily follow the celebrations.

Holy Week in the Spanish culture
Many Spanish artists have included, recreated or used the Holy Week as a background in their creations, such as paintings, music, literature or movies, reflecting the cultural and social importance of these events. Painter Zuloaga, writers Antonio Machado and Federico García Lorca, composer Joaquin Turina and filmmaker Mateo Gil are some examples.

See also
Catholic Church in Spain
Holy Week
Holy Week in Mexico
Holy Week in the Philippines
Holy Week procession

References

External links

 Holy Week in Córdoba 
 Holy Week in Córdoba 

 
Catholic holy days
Spain
Spain